Ustad Mohammad Wazir Khan(1860-1926) served as the head of Arbab-e-Nishat (Music Department of Rampur State) during the period of Nawab Hamid Ali Khan of Rampur. He was also an excellent playwright who established the Rampur theatre in the building of club Ghar in Rampur.

Early life and background
Wazir Khan was born in the former Rampur State to Ameer Khan Beenkar. He was the descendant of Naubat Khan and Hussaini (Tansen's daughter). Besides music, Wazir Khan's interests spanned many fields and areas. He was also a professional playwright, poet, published author, painter, passionate photographer, and a well-practiced calligrapher. Primarily he used to do Calligraphy in Arabic and Persian.In poetry he was the student of Daagh Dehlvi. As a Musicologist he wrote the Risala Mausibi. In addition, Wazir Khan was proficient in  many languages, such as Arabic, Persian, Urdu, Hindi, Bangla, Marathi and Gujarati

Cuisine
All the Naubat Khanis were fond of good food. They were able to develop their own cuisine. Rice preparations were included in their meals and Kabab featured regularly. Rakabdars from the court of Awadh were employed in their kitchens.

It was said that if anyone from this family doesn't take Dessert after each meal than he is not a Naubat Khani.

The preparation at their kitchens were so rich in Ingredients that once Nawab Hamid Ali Khan said that if this family was not fond of such good food they could have houses made of Gold and silver.

Disciples
Nayak Wazir Khan was the master of Nawab Hamid Ali Khan of Rampur, Allauddin Khan, Hafiz Ali Khan, and Vishnu Narayan Bhatkhande. Alauddin Khan went on to establish the modern Maihar Gharana, with disciples such as Ali Akbar Khan (son), Annapurna Devi (daughter), Pandit Ravi Shankar (son-in-law), Nikhil Banerjee, Vasant Rai, Pannalal Ghosh, Bahadur Khan, and Sharan Rani.

Struggle of Alauddin Khan
Wazir Khan lived like a prince and it was not easy for a commoner to approach the musician directly. Alauddin was quite desperate to become his disciple and it is said that one day he threw himself in front of the Nawab's vehicle. The Nawab of Rampur was pleased with Alauddin's perseverance so he sent the vehicle to fetch Wazir Khan and Alauddin was made the disciple of Wazir Khan. Wazir Khan taught Alauddin nothing for two years and only began to teach him when he came to know about the hardships Alauddin's wife was facing at home.

Family tree

  I. Samokhan Singh, Raja of Kishangarh.Imperial forces fought with the forces of Mughal Emperor Akbar.Samokhan Singh was Killed in battle.
  II. Jhanjhan Singh, Yuvraj Sahib of Kishangarh. Present in the battle and was killed.
  III. Misri Singh (Naubat Khan), Yuvraj Sahib of Kishangarh. Put under house arrest. Accepts Islam. Akbar confers title of Khan.Emperor Akbar arranges Naubat Khan's marriage to Saraswati, the daughter of Tansen. Jahangir confers the title of Naubat Khan and promotes him to the rank of 500 personal and 200 horse.
  IV. Lal Khan Gunsamundra.Title of Gunsamundra conferred by Shahjahan on 19 November 1637.
V.Bisram Khan.One of the Chief musicians at the court of Mughal Emperor Shahjahan and Mughal Emperor Aurangzeb
VI.Manrang
VII.Bhupat khan
IX.Sidhar Khan
 VIII. khushal Khan Gunsamundra.
 X. Nirmol Shah
XI.Naimat Khan, Sadarang (1670–1748). Developed Khayal, chief musician of Mohammad Shah Rangeela.
XII. Naubat Khan II
XIII.Feroz Khan, Adarang.
XIV.Mohammad Ali Khan
 XV. Omrao Khan.
XVI. Haji Mohammad Ameer Khan Khandara. Went to perform haj with Nawab Kalbey Ali Khan
XVII. Wazir Khan (Rampur). (1860–1926).Chief musician at the court of Nawab Hamid Ali Khan of Rampur
XIX. Mohammad Nazeer Khan
XXII. Mohammad Dabir Khan.
XXIII.Mohammad Shabbir Khan
XX. Mohammad Naseer Khan.
 XXI.Mohammad Sagheer Khan.
 XVIII. Fida Ali Khan.
 XXIV. Mumtaz Ali Khan.XXV. Imtiyaz ali khan.
 XXVI.Imdad Ali Khan'''.

See also
Hindustani classical music
Sadarang
Tansen
Naubat Khan
Kishangarh

References

Indian male classical musicians
Indian royalty
Mughal nobility
Akbar
Indian Shia Muslims
Hindustani instrumentalists
Veena players
Year of birth unknown
Year of death unknown
1860 births
1926 deaths
People from Rampur, Uttar Pradesh
Indian musicologists
19th-century Indian dramatists and playwrights
19th-century Indian musicians
19th-century Indian Muslims
19th-century male musicians
19th-century musicologists